Cistus asper is a shrubby species of flowering plant in the family Cistaceae with purple-pink flowers. It was first described in 2005 and is endemic to El Hierro in the Canary Islands.

Phylogeny
A 2011 molecular phylogenetic study placed C. asper as a member of the purple and pink flowered clade of Cistus species, along with some other Canary Island endemics (Cistus chinamadensis, Cistus horrens, Cistus ocreatus, and Cistus symphytifolius).

References

asper
Plants described in 2005
Flora of the Canary Islands